Franklin John Potter (October 6, 1898 - May 16, 1981) served in the California State Assembly representing the 57th district from 1941 to 1945 and during World War I he served in the United States Army.

References

United States Army personnel of World War I
Republican Party members of the California State Assembly
20th-century American politicians
1898 births
1981 deaths